Yamada Station (山田駅) is/was the name of four train stations in Japan:

 Yamada Station (Gifu)
 Yamada Station (Osaka)
 Yamada Station (Tokyo)
 The old name of Iseshi Station